Soapy may refer to:

Nickname
 Neil Castles (born 1934), retired NASCAR driver
 Jack Shapiro (1907-2001), American football player who played one game in the National Football League, becoming the shortest player ever in the league
 Soapy Smith (1860-1898), con artist, saloon and gambling house proprietor, gangster and crime boss of the American Old West
 Harry Vallence (1905-1991), Australian rules footballer
 G. Mennen Williams (1911-1988), 41st Governor of Michigan, Assistant Secretary of State for African Affairs under President John F. Kennedy and Chief Justice of the Michigan Supreme Court

Fictional characters
 Soapy, the protagonist of the O. Henry short story "The Cop and the Anthem"
 Soapy Jones, a sidekick in 15 Western movies (1946-1948), played by Roscoe Ates
 Thomas "Soapy" Malloy, a minor character in four P. G. Wodehouse novels, starting with Sam the Sudden
 Soapy, a character in the 1938 film Angels with Dirty Faces, played by Billy Halop
 Soapy Soutar, a friend of Oor Wullie

Other uses
 Soapy Awards,  an award presented by Soap Opera Digest magazine from 1977 until 1983

See also
 Samuel Wilberforce (1805-1873), English Anglican bishop known as "Soapy Sam"
 Soap opera, also known as a soapie
 Soupy Sales (1926-2009), American comedian born Milton Supman

Lists of people by nickname